Maksymiuk is a Polish and Ukrainian surname. Notable people with the surname include:

Janusz Maksymiuk (born 1947), Polish politician
Jerzy Maksymiuk (born 1936), Polish composer, pianist, and conductor

See also
Roman Maksymyuk (born 1974), Ukrainian footballer and manager

Polish-language surnames